WWF Royal Rumble is a professional wrestling video game released in 2000 for arcades and the Dreamcast. THQ published the title for the Dreamcast while Sega released it for arcades. It is based on the World Wrestling Federation (WWF) professional wrestling promotion and its yearly Royal Rumble event, this game is based on the 2000 edition. Yuke's, creators of the WWF SmackDown! series developed Royal Rumble, which had several unique features including support for up to nine wrestlers on the screen simultaneously. The game is also based on the pay-per-view Royal Rumble (2000).

The Dreamcast version was released to mixed reviews that faulted its small roster and lack of gameplay modes.

Gameplay 

The game has two modes, Exhibition and Royal Rumble. In Exhibition mode, the player chooses a wrestler along with a partner and wrestles a series of singles matches. The player's partner can interfere on the player's behalf on command. These partner moves can be used any number of times during the match, but must be recharged before they can be used again. The object of each match is to wear down the opponent using various attacks and grappling maneuvers, decreasing their life bar before ending the match by pinfall or knockout.

Royal Rumble mode involves a multi-wrestler match in which the player must eliminate a certain number of opponents from the match within a time limit by sending them over the top rope and onto the floor. Eliminating opponents adds more time to the player's clock; eliminating larger wrestlers offers a higher time bonus. Due to size of the game's roster, wrestlers appear multiple times in the same Royal Rumble match.

Each player has a super meter that fills up during the course of the match. When it fills up, the player receives an "S" icon, which can be used to instantly recover from pin attempts in Exhibition mode or re-enter the ring during a Royal Rumble match.

This was Big Show's only video game appearance with the 2000 roster, as he was removed from WWF SmackDown! 2: Know Your Role and WWF No Mercy due to his demotion to Ohio Valley Wrestling. Coincidentally, he returned at the following year's Royal Rumble. Kurt Angle and Tazz (who debuted in a match against Angle on the 2000 edition of the titular pay-per-view) made their first WWF video game debuts in this game, before No Mercy and SmackDown! 2.

Reception

The Dreamcast version received "average" reviews according to video game review aggregator Metacritic.

One of the biggest criticisms was of the small number of playable characters, which IGN called "paper thin" and GameSpots Jeff Gerstmann called confining. The game's lack of modes was also criticized. IGN recommended other Japanese Dreamcast wrestling titles such as Toukon Retsuden and Giant Gram over Royal Rumble. The earliest review came from PlanetDreamcast, which gave it a low score of four out of ten over a month before the game was released. Daniel Erickson of NextGen said that the game is neither deep nor revolutionary but overall fun. In Japan, Famitsu gave it a score of 30 out of 40.

Notes

References

External links 
 
 

2000 video games
Arcade video games
Dreamcast games
Sega arcade games
WWE video games
Royal Rumble
THQ games
Video games developed in Japan
Video games scored by Tommy Tallarico
Yuke's games
Multiplayer and single-player video games
Professional wrestling games